Marc Griffin, known professionally as Marc E. Bassy, is an American singer and songwriter from the San Francisco Bay Area. He is the former vocalist of the Los Angeles-based pop band 2AM Club. His solo works include his 2014 mixtape Only the Poets, 2015 release East Hollywood, and the 2016 EP Groovy People, including the single "You & Me" featuring G-Eazy.

After releasing his debut album Gossip Columns through Republic Records in 2017, Bassy opted to go independent, forming New Gold Medal Records and releasing the full-length projects PMD and Little Men in 2019 and 2021, respectively.

Before putting out his own works, he was a songwriter, and wrote for artists such as CeeLo Green, Sean Kingston, Wiz Khalifa, and Ty Dolla Sign.

Early life
Griffin was raised in the Bay Area, where his mother rented from singer-songwriter, Tracy Chapman. He was raised in different areas, including Richmond, CA. During his teenage years, he moved to Mill Valley and attended Tamalpais High School. After graduation, he went to UC Santa Cruz for music but only stayed there for two years and left school to start 2AM Club in Los Angeles.

Career
Griffin started his music career as the lead singer of 2AM Club, releasing an album and mixtape. However, the band was dropped by its label Sony/ATV and went on an indefinite hiatus starting June 29, 2015. He went to live with his friend in Los Angeles and wrote songs for other artists. His claim to fame started in Chicago Illinois when he set the record for the longest air guitar solo at a silent disco "playing" in front of 30,000 people. After releasing Only the Poets and East Hollywood and receiving positive critical reception, he was signed to Universal Republic Records.

In October 2017, Griffin planned to go on a co-headlining tour, the Bebe & Bassy Tour with American singer and songwriter Bebe Rexha in support of Bassy's debut album Gossip Columns, released on October 13, and Rexha's EP All Your Fault: Pt. 2. However, the tour was short-lived due to an infection putting Rexha on strict vocal rest. In March 2018, Griffin went on a US tour with fellow Bay Area artist Rexx Life Raj for his debut album.

Discography

Studio albums

Mixtapes

Extended plays

Singles

As lead artist

As featured artist

Music videos

References

External links
 
 Marc E. Bassy lyrics

Living people
1987 births
Tamalpais High School alumni
University of California, Santa Cruz alumni
Rappers from Los Angeles
21st-century American rappers